Bongosso (or Bougounso) is a village and seat (chef-lieu) of the commune of Koromo in the Cercle of Koutiala in the Sikasso Region of southern Mali.

French explorer René Caillié stopped at Bongosso in February 1828 on his journey to Timbuktu. He was travelling with a caravan transporting kola nuts to Djenné. He described the village in his book Travels through Central Africa to Timbuctoo published in 1830. He wrote:
About eleven in the morning we arrived at Bancousso [Bongosso], a large village containing a population of five or six hundred, and situated in a well cultivated plain, shaded by baobabs. This village has a large market, well supplied with the productions of the country; I saw in it a great quantity of cloth and earthen pots which are made here.

References

Sources

.

Populated places in Sikasso Region